Fábio Neves Florentino (in Saquarema, October 4, 1986) is a Brazilian footballer.

References

External links
 CBF 
 
 
 Fábio Neves at ZeroZero

1986 births
Living people
Brazilian footballers
Brazilian expatriate footballers
Fluminense FC players
América Futebol Clube (RN) players
Oeste Futebol Clube players
Agremiação Sportiva Arapiraquense players
Associação Atlética Caldense players
ABC Futebol Clube players
Botafogo Futebol Clube (PB) players
Gwangju FC players
NorthEast United FC players
Treze Futebol Clube players
Uberaba Sport Club players
Sampaio Corrêa Futebol e Esporte players
Central Sport Club players
Nacional Atlético Clube (Patos) players
K League 2 players
Campeonato Brasileiro Série A players
Campeonato Brasileiro Série B players
Campeonato Brasileiro Série D players
Expatriate footballers in South Korea
Expatriate footballers in India
Brazilian expatriate sportspeople in South Korea
Brazilian expatriate sportspeople in India
Association football midfielders
People from Saquarema